Lily Ah Toy (born Wong Wu Len) (October 24, 1917 – October 15, 2001) was an Australian pioneer and businesswoman famous in the Northern Territory.

Biography

On October 24, 1917, Ah Toy was born in Darwin to Chinese parents. She attended Darwin Public School and left when she was 14 to become a housemaid. On November 9, 1936, she married Jimmy Ah Toy, taking his surname. She then set up a general store in Pine Creek. She had five children of her own, and adopted five more; she then moved to Adelaide before moving back to Pine Creek in 1945. Ah Toy died in Darwin on October 15, 2001.

Awards

In 1988, she was honoured as one of eight Northern Territorians who had made a significant contribution to the territory. In 2003, she was honoured in the Tribute to Northern Territory Women.

References

1917 births
2001 deaths
People from Darwin, Northern Territory
Australian women in business
20th-century Australian businesspeople
20th-century Australian women